The following is a list of the 28 municipalities (comuni) of the former Province of Medio Campidano, Sardinia, Italy.

List

See also 
List of municipalities of Italy

References 

Medio Campidano